The MV Wakashio oil spill occurred after the Japanese bulk carrier Wakashio ran aground on a coral reef on 25 July 2020 at around 16:00 UTC. The ship began to leak fuel oil in the following weeks, and broke apart in mid August. Although much of the oil on board Wakashio was pumped out before she broke in half, an estimated 1,000 tonnes of oil spilled into the ocean in what was called by some scientists the worst environmental disaster ever in Mauritius. Two weeks after the incident, the Mauritian government declared the incident a national emergency.

Background
MV Wakashio, a large capesize bulk carrier, was built by the Universal Shipbuilding Corporation of Tsu, Japan. She was laid down on 23 September 2004, launched on 9 March 2007, and was delivered on 30 May 2007. The ship belonged to Okiyo Maritime Corp., an associate company of Nagashiki Shipping Co. Ltd., and was operated by Mitsui O.S.K. Lines. At the time of her grounding, Wakashio was sailing under a Panamanian flag of convenience while under Japanese ownership. The ship was sailing without cargo, and departed from Lianyungang, China on 4 July, stopped in Singapore, and was scheduled to reach Tubarão, Brazil on 13 August. A crew of 20 was on board, none of whom were injured.

Japan's ClassNK inspection body said in a statement on 11 August that the ship had passed an annual inspection in March. Mitsui OSK said they doubted whether the incident would have a significant effect on their earnings.

Incident 

Wakashio ran aground on a coral reef on 25 July, but did not immediately begin leaking oil. Oil began to leak from the ship on 6 August, by which time Mauritius authorities were trying to control the spill and minimize its effects. They isolated environmentally sensitive areas of the coast while waiting for help from foreign countries to pump out an estimated 3,890 tons of very low sulphur-fuel oil. By 10 August, about 1,000 metric tons of fuel had spilled, with estimates of the remaining oil onboard ranging from 2,500 to 3,000 metric tons. High winds and  waves halted cleanup efforts on 10 August; visible cracks in the hull of the ship led to worries that the ship might "break in two," according to Mauritius' prime minister Pravind Kumar Jugnauth. Jugnauth said that 3,000 tons of oil had been pumped out of the ship's fuel reservoirs.

The ship broke up on 15 August when there were still 166 tons of fuel inside. After she split, Wakashio's bow section was towed into the open ocean and scuttled on 24 August. Recovery operations continued around the stern section, which remained aground, and on 31 August a tugboat working on the wreck sank after colliding with a barge in heavy weather, killing at least three crewmembers. In October, a salvage contract for the remaining stern section of Wakashio, still grounded on the reef, was awarded to Lianyungang Dali Underwater Engineering of China, which planned to begin deconstruction in December and continue for at least several months.

According to investigators who conducted interviews with crew members, the crew had been celebrating the birthday of a sailor on board the ship at the time of the grounding, had sailed near shore for a wi-fi signal. However, local police denied reports that the ship had sailed close to land seeking a Wi-Fi signal, saying that looking for a phone signal would not have required sailing so close to land. Plus, the ship's vessel operator, Mitsui OSK Lines, stated that their fleet had access to free and unlimited internet access. The ship then failed to respond to warnings of the errant course. The ship's captain, a 58-year old Indian national named Sunil Kumar Nandeshwar, and deputy captain were arrested on 18 August on suspicion of negligence in operating the vessel.

The grounding happened at an area which is listed under the Ramsar convention on wetlands of international importance and near the marine park of Blue Bay. Greenpeace stated that "[t]housands of species [...] are at risk of drowning in a sea of pollution, with dire consequences for Mauritius’ economy, food security and health."

Aftermath

Cleanup 
Prime Minister Pravind Kumar Jugnauth declared a "state of environmental emergency" and requested help from international community. "When biodiversity is in peril, there is urgency to act,"

India acted as first responder On 11 August 2020, Indian Oil Mauritius Ltd (IOML) started to evacuate oil from the breached vessel onto the IOML barge Tresta Star, which had a capacity to hold 1,000 tonnes of oil. 

India sent  of technical equipment and material to the country to help contain the oil spill as well as a 10-member team of the Indian Coast Guard specialising in containing oil spills Including Graphene oil absorbent pads called as ‘Sorbene’ pads, and are being used in the cleanup operation. These special pads were supplied by Mumbai-headquartered clean-tech startup Log 9 Spill Containment Pvt. Ltd. These Graphene-based ‘Sorbene’ pads are able to absorb large volumes of oil and can be reused for up to 6-7 times so that the sorbents can provide more recovery of spilled oil.”

French President Emmanuel Macron tweeted, "France is there. Alongside the people of Mauritius. You can count on our support dear Jugnauth." France sent both military and civilian equipment and personnel from its overseas territory of Réunion.

Local volunteers joined forces to remedy the situation by making cloth barriers stuffed with straw and human hair. Japan sent a six-member crew of specialists to help in the cleanup. 

The United Nations Conference on Trade and Development said the spill "risks bringing devastating consequences for the economy, food security, health and tourism industry."  The group also reminded countries about the importance of international legal instruments such as the HNS Convention for liability and compensation.

In August 2020, Japan P&I, the insurer of Wakashio, appointed two companies namely Polyeco SA and Le Floch Depollution for the clean-up operations in the south east of Mauritius.

Spilled oil was collected and loaded onto barges for handling in Port Louis. On 31 August, a fatal accident occurred during a squall when the tug  collided with its barge and subsequently sank; three of the eight-person crew were killed and one more was reported missing.

By early November, all surface oil had been removed from Mauritius waters, and restoration of the coastline was expected to be completed by early 2021.

A media tour was organized by Japan P&I Club on 14 January 2021 following the clean-up operations in the south east of Mauritius. The operations mobilized a total of 370 people over a period of 5 months. Some  of liquid waste was pumped and treated at the Virgin Oil Ltd and Eco Fuel Ltd oil refineries, while  of solid waste was extracted from the shorelines.

Anti-government protests 

Perceived failure of the government to respond promptly and effectively resulted in protests. In Mauritius, thousands of protesters assembled in the capital Port Louis, focusing on the Prime Minister Pravind Jugnauth, including calls for the prime minister to step down. The Prime Minister has denied any responsibility. International protests, primarily led by Mauritian diaspora, also occurred in Canada, New Zealand, Australia, Switzerland, France, Luxembourg, Germany, and the UK.

The government has suspended the parliament, and has been accused of suppressing local media and preventing independent reporting regarding the incident, drawing sharp rebuke. Additionally, the government has been criticised for delegating critical decision-making to faceless and unaccountable 'advisors'.

Calls for shipping industry reform 
The oil spill has, along with the 2020 Beirut explosion, brought into sharp contrast failures of the shipping industry, with critics highlighting lax attitude to operational safety.  Shipping industry commentators and publications have also called for self-reflection by the stakeholders, including supporting the calls for increased shipping industry financial responsibility when it comes to disaster response and cleanup.

Court trial 
Sunil Kumar Nandeshwar, captain, was found guilty under the 2007 Merchant Shipping Act by the Court of Investigation, Mauritius, and admitted to being moderately under the influence of alcohol. Further investigation found that the lookout officer had been allowed to stay at the birthday party which meant that he could not ensure the safe navigation of the ship. Nandeshwar publicly apologized for his actions, while first officer, Hitihanillage Subhoda Janendra Tilakaratna (also convicted) pled for leniency. The duo were sentenced on 27 December 2021.

In her ruling magistrate Ida Dookhy-Rambarun refused to commute the sentences to time served and ordered Captain Sunil Kumar Nandeshwar (aged 58) and second officer Hitihanillage Subhoda Janendra Tilakaratna (aged 45) to remain in prison for 4 additional months. Magistrate Ida Dookhy-Rambarun called their actions irresponsible when she imposed the 20-month sentences, adding that they failed to monitor their ship and became too distracted whilst looking for a Wi-Fi signal from shore to allow the crew to connect with families after being separated during the Covid-19 pandemic. They had both pleaded guilty to endangering safe navigation. Immediately after the 27 December 2021 court hearing, the port agent updated the two men’s passports and travel documents to expedite their departures.
Captain Nandeshwar returned to his family in Bhopal, central India and issued a statement thanking the Maritime Union of India (MUI), High Commission of India in Port Louis, Shipping Ministry of India, and External Affairs Ministry of India for their support. MV Wakashio's second officer Tilakaratna had been the watch officer and switched the vessel on autopilot. He admitted to failing to consult the vessel’s echo sounder before hitting the reef, and also failed to object to the lookout not being present on the bridge of the doomed vessel. First officer, Robert Geonzon Secuya, and chief engineer, Pritam Singh, were released on 23 December 2021, after being detailed as potential witnesses in the trial.

Environmental damage

Oceanographer and environmental engineer Vassen Kauppaymuthoo said, "Around a little bit less than 50 percent of this lagoon is covered by environmentally sensitive areas, be it corals, be it seagrass, be it mangroves, be it entire mudflats, sand beaches and dunes, which is huge. Which confirms the sensitivity of this lagoon, in terms of oil spill." Ecotoxicologist Christopher Goodchild from Oklahoma State University said, "With this oil spill it looks like there is infiltration out of the mangroves, so you have the oily substance that can bind to organic matter or dirt and start to settle in and just being able to remove that toxic sediment can be a real challenge."  Flakes of the damaged anti-fouling coating on the hull can also poison the marine fauna and flora on the reef and surroundings in a similar fashion to what occurred on the Great Barrier Reef. Reuters quoted unnamed scientists as saying that the spill was likely the worst environmental incident in the history of Mauritius, with effects possibly lingering for decades.

The island's environment minister Kavy Ramano, together with the fisheries minister, told the press that it was the first time that the country faced a catastrophe of this magnitude, and that they were insufficiently equipped to handle the problem.

Many dead sea mammals washed up on local beaches in the days following the spill, and more have been found seriously ill. Among the dead animals are dolphins and melon-headed whales.

Compensation and cleanup funding

Mauritius requested compensation for the spill from Wakashio owner Nagashiki Shipping, which according to the International Convention on Civil Liability for Bunker Oil Pollution Damage is responsible for oil damage.

On 2 September 2020, Mauritius also asked Japan to pay  in reparations for the disaster; the island nation demanded the money to "support local fishermen whose livelihoods were adversely impacted by an oil leak last month", according to a Mauritian government document. 

The ship's operator/charterer, Mitsui O.S.K. Lines, pledged  (about US$). The Mauritius Natural Environment Recovery Fund will "fund environmental projects and support the local fishing community". The president of MOL cited the payment as their "social responsibility" while apologizing for the damage. MOL also expects that ship owner Nagashiki Shipping will contribute to the Fund.

The local NGO, No To Poverty, said that MV Wakashio oil spill incident was an act and/or combination of acts that endanger/s the health, life, property, morals or comfort of the public or obstruct the right of the public in the exercise or enjoyment of rights common to all and the locals shall be treated fairly for compensation. No To Poverty's president expressed worry that more efforts will be given for the cleaning up and the negative economic impacts of the oil spill which is worsening the poverty situation on the island ignored.

See also 
 Katrina P oil spill
 El Palito oil spill
 List of oil spills

References

External links

Mauritius oil spill: An alarm bell for environmental safety (by Nick Clark, Al Jazeera)

2020 disasters in Africa
2020 in Mauritius
2020 in the environment
August 2020 events in Africa
Environment of Mauritius
July 2020 events in Africa
Oil spills in Africa
Maritime incidents in 2020
Transport disasters in Mauritius